is a Japanese actor from Kyoto. His father was silent-film star Tsumasaburo Bando. With his elder brothers, the late Takahiro and Masakazu, he is one of the Three Tamura Brothers.

Ryō graduated from Seijo University and made his cinema debut in the 1966 Hiroshi Inagaki film Abare Goemon starring Toshirō Mifune. He also appeared in the 1989 Hiroshi Teshigahara film Rikyū with Rentarō Mikuni in the title role.

Since his debut he has taken roles in both jidaigeki and modern films and television. He portrayed Ōoka Tadasuke in the 1984  television series Kawaite sōrō  and the final six years of the long-running prime-time television series Abarenbō Shōgun, replacing Tadashi Yokouchi. A repeating modern role has been Detective Sōsuke Kariya in two-hour dramas costarring Miki Fujitani.

Tamura played Tōdō Takatora in the 2000 NHK taiga drama Aoi Tokugawa Sandai. The network also tapped him for the 2004 miniseries Saigo no Chūshingura in which he portrayed Yanagisawa Yoshiyasu.

Selected filmography

Films
Mujo (1970)
Ryoma Ansatsu (1974), Ōkubo Toshimichi
The Fall of Ako Castle (1978)
Rikyu (1989), Toyotomi Hidenaga
The Samurai I Loved (2005)

Television dramas
Daichūshingura (1971)
Haru no Sakamichi (1971), Yagyu Samon
Kunitori Monogatari (1973)
Edo o Kiru (3rd season) (1977)
The Yagyu Conspiracy (1978)
Kawaite sōrō (1984)
Shogun Iemitsu Shinobi Tabi (1990–93)
Abarenbō Shōgun (1997-2004)
Aoi Tokugawa Sandai (2000), Tōdō Takatora
Naruto Hichō (2018)

References

External links
Individual web site
Tamura Kyodai Official Web Site

田村亮 at JMDB
Saigo no Chūshingura at NHK

1946 births
Living people
Male actors from Kyoto
Seijo University alumni